Sweeps is a rating period for Nielsen ratings.

Sweeps may also refer to:
 Sagittarius Window Eclipsing Extrasolar Planet Search, a 2006 astronomical survey
 "Sweeps" (That's So Raven), a 2004 television episode
 "Sweeps", a  Transformers TV series character
 Sweepstake

See also
 Sweep (disambiguation)